WinterStorm is a two-day music festival held annually in the seaside town of Troon, South Ayrshire.

History 
Since 2016 it has been held in Troon Town Hall, a location that overlooks the beach and the Firth of Clyde. The event is split over two stages, the Main Stage hosts the headline acts in the Concert Hall, it has a capacity of 600 standing plus 250 seated upstairs. The second stage, known as the Sessions Stage, has a capacity of 160 and hosts up and coming bands and artists as well as an acoustic event on the Sunday following WinterStorm; known as After the 'Storm. StormBreakers, a Battle of the Bands type event, has been held to give acts a chance to win a place on the Sessions Stage.

WinterStorm was conceived by Ian McCaig who is also the Festival Director and promoter of South Beach Sessions. South Beach Sessions is an ongoing programme of live music events which have included bands such as Rhino's Revenge, Pat McManus, Big Country, Stiff Little Fingers, Snakecharmer as well as a number of tribute acts.

The volunteer staff that run the event are known as 'StormTroopers. The main stage event is compared by Tom Russell, with Pete K Mally comparing the Sessions Stage.

WinterStorm branded merchandise and catering includes-

 WinterStormer Ayrshire Pie - Brownings the Bakers based in Kilmarnock.
 WinterStormin Ices - Ayrshire Ice Cream makers The Forum Cafe.
 Strathaven Ales WinterStorm Ale Cask Beer.
 Winterstorm stick of rock.

The Arran Mountains (Goat Fell) that can be seen from the Troon venue are the inspiration behind the WinterStorm logo.

Regular features of WinterStorm include-

 The WinterStorm Deckchair - a giant 6-foot deckchair available for bands and festival goers to have their photograph taken on.
 The WinterStorm Beach Clean - volunteers clean Troon Beach on the morning of the second day. For their efforts they receive a goody bag and a wee dram of whisky.

In November 2019, The Temple of the King Bench was unveiled. It was an original design iron-worked bench installed on the beach promenade. It acts as a memorial for lost musicians and absent friends. The dedication was supported by the Troon Blackrock Pipe Band and Doogie White who played an acoustic version of "The Temple of the King" (by Rainbow) - whose lyrics are inscribed on the bench "With just one wave of his strong right hand – he's gone to the Temple of the King".

In 2018, WinterStorm launched a charity single. It is a cover of AC/DC’s "It's A Long Way to the Top" featuring 1st Troon Boys Brigade Pipe Band. Side B has a cover "Bad Motor Scooter" a song by Montrose. Musicians that played on the single were Chris Glen (Sensational Alex Harvey Band), Doogie White (Rainbow and Michael Schenker Group) and Paul Mcmanus (GUN). The organizations to benefit from the single are dementia-based charity Playlist For Life and the See Me project aimed at reducing the stigma of mental health in youths.

At WinterStorm V the Main Stage was officially renamed to the Steve Strange Stage in memory of the Northern Irish music agent, who died on the 25 September 2021.

2016 - WinterStorm I

2017 - WinterStorm II

2018 - WinterStorm III

2019 - WinterStorm IV

2020 - WinterStorm V (Cancelled) 
WinterStorm V was due to take place on Friday 27th and Saturday 28th November 2020 but was postponed due to the COVID-19 pandemic. The announced lineup at the time of postponement was: -

2021 - WinterStorm V

2022 - WinterStorm VI

2023 - WinterStorm VII - "Legends and Legacies" 

In a change to the usual Friday and Saturday festival format, and After the 'Storm on Sunday, The Legends and Legacies of WinterStorm will feature the addition of a Thursday night line-up, and will touch on the best of the past seven years. Days splits to be announced.

See also
 Hammerfest
 Hard Rock Hell
 Ramblin' Man Fair
 Download Festival

References

External links
 Official website

Heavy metal festivals in the United Kingdom
Rock festivals in the United Kingdom
Annual events in the United Kingdom
Rock festivals in Scotland
Tourist attractions in Scotland
2016 establishments in Scotland